Jeff Alexander Leach (born 12 February 1984) is an English actor, writer and stand-up comedian. He has also worked as a television and radio presenter with shows airing in the UK, USA, Australia and Europe. He is most well known for appearing in feature films The Smoke as Dean and London Town as Ronnie, as well as voicing Simon "Ghost" Riley in Call of Duty: Modern Warfare. On television he hosted a number of shows for BBC Switch, BBC Three and E4.

Television career
Leach was raised in London by his cockney engineer father and Romanian drama teacher mother of Aromanian descent. Educated at the John Lyon School for boys in Harrow he obtained a degree from the University of Warwick in English Literature and Theatre Studies. He got a presenting job a BBC Switch show entitled The Surgery on BBC Two. After presenting Scene Stealers for BBC Switch and T in the Park Festival for BBC Three Leach had a stint as presenter of Big Brother's Big Mouth on E4. During 2009–2012 he became the face of Virgin Media and their Music on Demand channel which saw him present each year from V Festival, provide comedy continuity links for all of the content on the channel and interview artists such as Lady Gaga, Example, Kelly Rowland and Professor Green.

Between 2010 and 2012 he was signed up by the UK branch of Current TV to present two series of their show What Did I Do Last Night? in which the cameras followed the antics of young British people on a night out who were then shown their behaviour back to them following morning, when hungover. Leach was also signed up by BBC One to present The National Lottery Draws. During this time he hosted other shows for Current TV including an exposé on the dangers of male escorting entitled Male Hookers Uncovered in which Leach became a male escort for the purposes of the immersive documentary. Following on from this he presented one more documentary about sex addiction for BBC Three called Confessions of a Sex Addict.

In 2014 London Live launched in the UK and Jeff Leach became the presenter and executive producer of his own series called Jeff Leach +1. In 2019 he recorded an episode of Dinner With Dani for Amazon Prime and during 2020 he recorded multiple live shows for Comedy Central's stand-up comedy series This Week At The Cellar in the US, all recorded at the Comedy Cellar his home club in New York City.

Stand-up and film career
Leach began his stand up career in February 2010, performing on the UK comedy circuit and at the Edinburgh Fringe Festival. He was a finalist in the London New Comedian Award 2010, Laughing Horse New Act 2011 and a semi-finalist in the Leicester Square New Comedian 2011. He performed at the Edinburgh Fringe Festival in 2011 and 2012 with promoters Live Nation becoming a Top Ten Finalist in the Amused Moose Laugh Off Competition 2012. In 2013 Leach began dating fellow comedian Katherine Ryan, from Canada but their relationship ended.

In May 2014 Leach embarked on his debut solo comedy tour entitled 'Jeff Leach. FIT'.

His first professional theatre work was with the Royal Shakespeare Company during the Complete Works of Shakespeare Festival season playing the lead in Lope de Vega's 'The Capulets and the Montagues'. In 2013 Jeff completed a role in short film Shop Girl Blog and played rocker Lenny in online comedy series The Chaos. During 2014 he played the role of Simon in Channel 4 show Hollyoaks and also He also played the role of Dean in feature length independent British gangster thriller film The Smoke.

During 2015 he appeared in a number of short films, won a comedy award on the industry website Shooting People and at the Berlin Short Film Festival.

He appeared in Derrick Borte's London Town (2016).

Game career
Leach began his game career in 2015, voicing Walla Crowd, Prince Stefan, Sergeant Carleon, Peeves (voice) Field Marshal, Narrators, Power Tech Ardanno, Star Destroyer Comm, Catwalk Stormtrooper, ..., Simon 'Ghost' Riley, Mammoth, Space Marine, and Astra Militarum.

Controversy

On 9 May 2021 Activision announced that they have cut ties with Leach due to alleged misogynistic comments he made on Tauntfest in 2017 and a Livestream in late 2020. Leach claims the comments were taken out of context and that he was actually responding to an Internet troll.

References

Alumni of the University of Warwick
English male comedians
English television presenters
English radio presenters
English male stage actors
English people of Romanian descent
1984 births
Living people
Male actors from London
21st-century English comedians